The Bellerive Yacht Club is a yacht club in the Australian state of Tasmania. It was established in 1926 to cater for a growing population in the city of Clarence and encourage sailing activities amongst the population there. It has since grown to over 800 members with an annual turnover of over A$1 million.

The club sports a range of facilities, from a 120-berth marina to on-site maintenance facilities, a slipyard and crane, re-rigging areas, refueling and storage facilities, temporary moorings, and a clubhouse containing two bars, a bistro restaurant, an outdoor barbecue area, and a function centre.

The club organises a sailing calendar throughout the year which includes competitive and social events, and is also responsible for organising the annual Bellerive Regatta. The club has a friendly sporting rivalry with their western shore counterparts. The club also organises social activities for its members.

External links
 Official Website

References

Yacht clubs in Tasmania
1926 establishments in Australia
Sports clubs established in 1926
Sporting clubs in Tasmania